A jet bridge (also termed jetway, jetwalk, airgate, gangway, aerobridge/airbridge, skybridge, airtube, expedited suspended passenger entry system (E-SPES), or its official industry name passenger boarding bridge (PBB)) is an enclosed, movable connector which most commonly extends from an airport terminal gate to an airplane, and in some instances from a port to a boat or ship, allowing passengers to board and disembark without going outside and being exposed to harsh weather. Depending on building design, sill heights, fueling positions, and operational requirements, a jet bridge may be fixed or movable, swinging radially, and/or extending in length. The jetway was invented by Frank Der Yuen.

Similar devices are used for astronauts to enter spacecraft, which are installed in the appropriate height of the launch tower.

History

Before the introduction of jet bridges, passengers normally boarded an aircraft by walking along the ground-level ramp and climbing a set of movable stairs, or airstairs on aircraft so equipped. Mobile staircases or "ramp stairs" are employed at many airports around the world, particularly smaller airports and terminals supporting low cost carriers.

United Airlines tested an early prototype "Air Dock" in 1954. The first operational "Aero-Gangplank", as it was dubbed by inventor Lockheed Air Terminal, was installed by United at Chicago's O'Hare Airport in 1958.

Advantages
Jet bridges provide all-weather dry access to aircraft and enhance the security of terminal operations. They are often permanently attached at one end by a pivot (or rotunda) to the terminal building and have the ability to swing left or right. The cabin, at the end of the loading bridge, may be raised or lowered, extended or retracted, and may pivot, to accommodate aircraft of different sizes. These motions are controlled by an operator's station in the cab. The cab is provided with an accordion-like canopy, which allows the bridge to dock with aircraft with differing shapes, and provide a nearly weather-proof seal. Additionally, many models offer leveling devices for the portion of the floor that makes contact with the aircraft; this allows passengers to slowly transition from level aircraft floor to sloping jet bridge floor. As such, jet bridges provide enhanced access to aircraft for passengers with many types of disabilities and mobility impairments, as they may board and disembark without climbing stairs or using a specialized wheelchair lift.

Some airports with international gates have two or even three bridges for larger aircraft with multiple entrances. In theory, this allows for faster disembarking of larger aircraft, though it is quite common, especially on aircraft such as Boeing 747s and Boeing 777s, to use one bridge for only passengers in first class and/or business class, while the other bridge is for the use of passengers in economy class. In some designs, the second jet bridge would even extend over the aircraft wing, being suspended from an overhead structure. This was, for example, originally adopted for most wide body gates at Amsterdam Airport Schiphol. The Airbus A380 is unique in that both of its two passenger decks have outside access doors and so using loading bridges for each deck is possible, having the advantage of faster aircraft loading (in parallel). Faster loading can lead to lower airport charges, fewer delays and more passenger throughput for the airport, all factors which impact an airline's bottom line.

Though loading bridges are usually permanently attached at their terminal-building end, leaving only the cab free to move, this is not always the case. Those at Melbourne Airport's international terminal, and at Hong Kong's former Kai Tak Airport, are anchored in the middle and movable at either end to permit the terminal building-end to be raised or lowered to connect with either the departures level or the arrivals level of the terminal building.

Disadvantages
Loading bridges restrict aircraft parking to spots immediately adjacent to the terminal. Thus, airports use mobile staircases to facilitate disembarking at hardstands (remote parking positions).

Loading bridges may pose hazards to aircraft if handled improperly. If the bridge is not retracted fully before departure, it may contact protruding parts of the taxiing aircraft (e.g., a pitot tube), requiring repair and delays. Furthermore, during cold weather, the loading bridge may become frozen to the aircraft. In this case, when the jet bridge retracts, it could damage the aircraft if that area has not been properly de-iced.

When regional jets are used, jet bridges have another disadvantage, since they allow only one aircraft to park at the gate at a time. Several airlines have removed jet bridges at regional jet gates at airports such as Atlanta which are short on gates. When having passengers disembark on the ramp or apron, airlines can fit two or more regional jets per gate. In many other places like Beijing Capital Airport and Paris Charles de Gaulle Airport, a gate for large aircraft can be used to accommodate two smaller aircraft like Boeing 737s or Airbus A320s.

Several incidents of jet bridges collapsing include Sydney, Hong Kong, Seattle, Los Angeles, Baltimore, and Islamabad.

Airports frequently charge increased fees for using loading bridges on stands as opposed to mobile stairs, therefore low-cost airlines such as Ryanair have avoided using these wherever possible.

Use at small airports

Jet bridges are occasionally used at smaller, single-story airports. This is accomplished by a flight of stairs and, in some instances, a wheelchair lift. In this scenario, a passenger proceeds through the gate and then up a flight of stairs to meet the height of the jet bridge. An example of this can be found at South Bend International Airport. Alternatively, a ramp can be used in the terminal building to bring the passengers from the waiting area to the height of the jet bridge. For example, Sawyer International Airport has jet bridges that can load passengers onto smaller passenger aircraft such as the Saab 340 turboprop. The Ithaca Tompkins Regional Airport has two gates using this approach. This can be done to attract larger airlines that require use of a jet bridge to the airport, as well as to make disembarking smaller planes easier for disabled people and to improve the disembarking process in bad weather.

Use and appearance
At the airport terminal, the bridge is connected to a portal (called a "gate") in the terminal wall behind the gate desk. Once airplane boarding starts, passengers hand their boarding passes to the gate's attendant, who lets them pass through.

Inside, the bridge looks like a narrow, lighted hallway, without doors. Loading bridges usually have no windows, but glass walls are becoming more common. The walls are normally painted in accordance with airline standards, generally with relaxing colours. Some bridges have advertisements on interior or exterior walls. The floors of retractable bridges are generally uneven, creating a hazard for wheelchair users and others with mobility issues.

By using a retractable tunnel design, loading bridges may retract and extend varying lengths. Some airports use fixed walkways to effectively extend the reach of a loading bridge. The fixed walkway extends out from the terminal building and connects to the loading bridge rotunda. Occasionally, fixed bridges lead to multiple loading bridges. There are some jetways (such as several older bridges on the north terminal at Edmonton International Airport) that sit directly on the ground, as opposed to supports. These jetways are often used by small airlines or airplanes that are sometimes too low for conventional jetways (such as the Dash 8 and CRJ).

The cab of the loading bridge is raised and lowered to dock with aircraft of differing sill heights. The height of the cab is matched to the height of the aircraft door sill height. This often results in a slope along the length of the loading bridge.

Controls in older systems contain a large number of individual motor control buttons, with efficient operation requiring a high degree of operator skill and experience. Modern control consoles are much simpler, with only a few buttons, a graphic display console, and a single multi-axis joystick, with an overall appearance similar to that of a video game console in a video arcade.

Marketing
Marketing space on jetways was uncommon until the early 2000s when HSBC launched their campaign "The World's Local Bank.

Peter Stringham, head of marketing for HSBC worldwide, worked closely with Lowe's, the Group's global agency, in developing the campaign which required a single global platform. Stringham noticed jetways were a global medium which had not been tapped.

HSBC thus bought the rights to jetways across major localities in 81 countries and territories.

Gallery

See also 
Ground support equipment
Mobile lounge
Moveable bridges for a list of other moveable bridge types

References

External links 

Airport infrastructure
Moveable bridges
Articles containing video clips
Bridges by structural type